Vesnin is a Russian masculine surname, its feminine counterpart is Vesnina; it may refer to
Vesnin brothers, Russian architects:
Alexander Vesnin (1883–1959)
Leonid Vesnin (1880–1933)
Victor Vesnin (1882–1950)
7224 Vesnina, main-belt asteroid named after the brothers
Elena Vesnina (born 1986), Russian tennis player

Russian-language surnames